Phil Arnold (born Philip Aronoff Arnold; September 15, 1909 – May 9, 1968) was an American screen, stage, television, and vaudeville actor. He appeared in approximately 150 films and television shows between 1939 and 1968.

Arnold is familiar to modern viewers for his roles in several Three Stooges films such as Pardon My Backfire, Sing a Song of Six Pants, Tricky Dicks and The Three Stooges Go Around the World in a Daze. Probably his best-known role was off-camera, as the voice of Peeping Tom in The Ghost Talks and as Sir Tom in its remake Creeps.

Arnold also made appearances is such films as Good Times, Blackbeard's Ghost, The Adventures of Bullwhip Griffin, Hold On!, Zebra in the Kitchen and Robin and the 7 Hoods. His television work includes The Twilight Zone, Cowboy G-Men, Maverick, I Love Lucy The Adventures of Superman, and Bewitched.

Arnold died of a heart attack on May 9, 1968.

Selected filmography
 Buzzy Rides the Range (1940)
 Buzzy and the Phantom Pinto (1941)
 Killer at Large (1947)
 Deadline (1948)
 The Big Chase (1954)
The Court-Martial of Billy Mitchell (1955)
 Official Detective TV series  episode  'Armored Attack'  as Barnett  (1957)
 The Incredible Mr. Limpet (1964) as Short Fishman (uncredited)

References

External links
 
 
 
 

1909 births
1968 deaths
American male film actors
American male television actors
Jewish American male actors
Actors from Hackensack, New Jersey
Male actors from New Jersey
20th-century American male actors
20th-century American comedians
Burials at Eden Memorial Park Cemetery
20th-century American Jews